Casas-Ibáñez is a municipality in Albacete, Castile-La Mancha, Spain. It has a population of 4,234.

See also
Manchuela

References

External links 
Ayuntamiento de Casas-Ibáñez

Municipalities of the Province of Albacete